Tug of war was contested in two weight classes for men at the 1981 World Games.  These were the first World Games, an international quadrennial multi-sport event, and were held in Santa Clara, California in the United States. The 640 kg tug of war competition was the first event of the games, as it was held immediately following the opening ceremony at the same location, Buck Shaw Stadium. The Swiss athletes were associated with a club from Engelberg, while the United States was represented by a club from Orfordville, Wisconsin. In an interview during the Games, Albert Sabin, the chief judge of the event, revealed that he was from Birmingham, then hastened to add, "England, not (Birmingham) Alabama."

Medalists
Sources:

Tug of war, 640kg

The outdoor 640 kg tug of war event was conducted on 24 July 1981. It was the first event of the first World Games.

Results:
Netherlands def. Wales, 3-0
England def. Ireland, 3-0
Switzerland def. Sweden, 3-0
Netherlands def. U.S., 3-0
Ireland def. Wales, 3-0
England def. Sweden, 3-0
Switzerland def. U.S., 3-0
Netherlands def. England, 2-1
Wales def. Sweden, 3-0
Switzerland def. Ireland, 2-1
England def. U.S., 2-1
Sweden def. Netherlands, 3-0
Switzerland def. Wales, 3-0
Ireland def. U.S., 3-0
England def. Wales, 3-0
Switzerland def. Netherlands, 3-0
Ireland def. Sweden, 3-0
Wales def. U.S., 3-0
England def. Switzerland, 3-0
Netherlands def. Ireland, 3-0
Sweden def. U.S., 3-0

Final standing:
 England        15 points
 Switzerland    14
 Netherlands    11
 Ireland        10
 Sweden          6, tie
 Wales           6, tie
 USA             1

Tug of war, 720kg

The outdoor 720 kg tug of war event was conducted on 25 July 1981.

Results

Netherlands def. Wales, 3-0
England def. Ireland, 3-0
Switzerland def. Sweden, 3-0
Netherlands def. U.S., 3-0
Ireland def. Wales, 3-0
England def. Sweden, 3-0
Switzerland def. U.S., 3-0
Netherlands def. England, 3-0
Sweden def. Wales, 3-0
Switzerland def. Ireland, 3-0
England def. U.S., 3-0
Netherlands def. Sweden 3-0
Switzerland def. Wales, 3-0
Ireland def. U.S., 3-0
England def. Wales, 3-0
Switzerland def. Netherlands, 3-0
Sweden def. Ireland, 3-0
Wales def. U.S., 2-1
Switzerland def. England, 3-0
Netherlands def. Ireland, 3-0
Sweden def. U.S., 3-0

Final standings:
 Switzerland    18 points
 Netherlands    15
 England        12
 Sweden          9
 Ireland         6
 Wales           2
 USA             1

Other known individual participants:  SWE – Erik Johansson; USA – Tom Naatz

References

1981
1981 in tug of war
1981 World Games